Denise Hanke (born 31 August 1989) is a German volleyball player. She is a member of the Germany women's national volleyball team and is playing for Schweriner SC.

On 29 April 2020 Denise announced her retirement from volleyball.

References

External links
 

1989 births
Living people
German women's volleyball players
Volleyball players from Berlin